Communion is a 1989 American science fiction horror film based on the book of the same name by Whitley Strieber in 1987.

Starring Christopher Walken and Frances Sternhagen, it tells a story of a family that experiences an extraterrestrial phenomenon while on vacation at a remote home in the wilderness during which the father is abducted and all of their lives change. According to Strieber, the story is a real-life account of his own encounter with "visitors", with Walken playing the role of the author.

Plot
In 1985, New York based author Whitley Strieber (Walken) lives with his wife and child in Manhattan and seems to be successful. However, he is woken at night by paranoid dreams that someone else is in the room.

On a trip to the family cottage in the woods, on the first night the intruder alarm is triggered and Strieber sees a face watching him from the doorway. Bright light fills the cottage windows and wakes his son and two other family friends but his wife remains asleep.

Disturbed by this they all return to New York and life seemingly returns to normal but Strieber finds that his work and personal life are becoming affected by recurring nightmares and visions of strange alien beings including greys, blue doctors and bugs. This upsets his son and puts strain on his marriage.

After an incident at their cottage in which Strieber is so convinced that there are alien beings inside the home that he pulls his gun out and almost shoots his wife, and signs that his son is beginning to have the same visions, he is finally convinced to see a psychiatrist specialising in hypnotic regression therapy (Sternhagen).

The therapy confirms that he has possibly been abducted by unknown beings and experiments have been performed on him; however, he is still skeptical about it and reluctantly attends a group therapy session of fellow 'abductees'.

Eventually he realizes he has to confront his visions, real or not, and returns to the cottage where most of the incidents seem to occur. He interacts with the alien beings and realizes he has been in contact with them his whole life and it was passed on from his father and he will, in turn, pass it on to his son.

Making up with his family Strieber comes to accept the alien visitors as part of his life and in the last scene he sits in his office and embraces the face of a 'grey' alien.

Cast
 Christopher Walken as Whitley Strieber
 Lindsay Crouse as Anne Strieber
 Frances Sternhagen as Dr. Janet Duffy
 Andreas Katsulas as Alex
 Joel Carlson as Andrew Strieber

Reception
It received a mostly negative reaction and was panned by Strieber himself due to its non-factual portrayal of him. The film was considered a box office failure. It has subsequently picked up a moderate cult following. On Rotten Tomatoes, the film holds a 33% approval rating based on 12 reviews, with an average rating of 4.6/10.

Some critics praised Walken's performance as the highlight of the film. Los Angeles Times called his performance "terrific" and added: "Walken dazzles, giving us an intelligent, talented man caught in a nightmare and fearing for his sanity".

Music
The score was composed by Eric Clapton and Alan Clark, though no official soundtrack album was ever released. In 2010, the Main Theme and End Credit theme were released by film composer and former Oingo Boingo guitarist Steve Bartek.

References

External links
 
 

1989 films
Alien abduction films
American biographical drama films
Films set in New York City
American independent films
1989 crime drama films
Films directed by Philippe Mora
Biographical films about writers
Films set in 1985
Films based on works by Whitley Strieber
1980s English-language films
1980s American films